Liberty Township is a township in Bedford County, Pennsylvania, United States. The population was 1,382 at the 2020 census. Warriors Path State Park is located in the township.

General information
ZIP code: 16678
Area code: 814
Local telephone exchange: 635

Geography
Liberty Township is located along the northern border of Bedford County. It includes the unincorporated community of Stonerstown. The borough of Saxton is surrounded by the township but is not part of it.  Warriors Path State Park is located south of Saxton, on the inside of a long bend in the Raystown Branch of the Juniata River.

Recreation
The Warriors Path State Park and portions of the Pennsylvania State Game Lands Number 73 and Number 108 are located in the township.

Demographics

As of the census of 2000, there were 1,477 people, 597 households, and 445 families residing in the township.  The population density was 56.2 people per square mile (21.7/km).  There were 693 housing units at an average density of 26.4/sq mi (10.2/km).  The racial makeup of the township was 98.78% White, 0.27% African American, 0.14% Asian, and 0.81% from two or more races.

There were 597 households, out of which 30.7% had children under the age of 18 living with them, 61.0% were married couples living together, 11.1% had a female householder with no husband present, and 25.3% were non-families. 21.4% of all households were made up of individuals, and 11.6% had someone living alone who was 65 years of age or older.  The average household size was 2.45 and the average family size was 2.85.

In the township the population was spread out, with 22.8% under the age of 18, 7.0% from 18 to 24, 27.2% from 25 to 44, 25.6% from 45 to 64, and 17.3% who were 65 years of age or older.  The median age was 41 years. For every 100 females, there were 90.1 males.  For every 100 females age 18 and over, there were 87.5 males.

The median income for a household in the township was $32,339, and the median income for a family was $38,207. Males had a median income of $29,402 versus $23,875 for females. The per capita income for the township was $15,468.  About 10.9% of families and 13.1% of the population were below the poverty line, including 21.0% of those under age 18 and 13.1% of those age 65 or over.

References

Populated places established in 1775
Townships in Bedford County, Pennsylvania
Townships in Pennsylvania